The Comandanti class of patrol vessels consists of four units operated by the Italian Navy, named as Nuove Unità Minori Combattenti (NUMC)

Features
The construction of these units used hull and superstructure built with stealth features. The NUMC (Comandanti class) and Nuove Unità di Pattugliamento d'Altura, NUPA share logistics, interoperability, features of the combat system and integrated telecommunications systems.

Ships
These units operate in conjunction with NUMA of COMFORPAT, the Forces Command patrol for surveillance and Coastal Defence and have their operational base in Augusta. They serve as coastal patrol and traffic control, cargo and surveillance in immigration control.Comandante Foscari is used for trials on new versions of Oto Melara 76/62 mm Strales/Davide gun:
 October 2004: new stealth shield for gun;
 November 2009: to La Spezia beginning “DAVIDE/DART” program trials, with boarding of the Oto Melara 76/62 mm Strales/Davide prototype.

References

Ships built by Fincantieri
Patrol ship classes
Patrol vessels of the Italian Navy
Ships built in La Spezia